Stizocera laceyi is a species of beetle in the family Cerambycidae. It was described by Linsley in 1934.

References

Stizocera
Beetles described in 1934